Bernard August Cousino (1 August 1902 – 29 December 1994) was an American music technology inventor. He is known for inventing an endless loop tape cartridge design in 1952, known as the Audio Vendor, patented under US2804401A. The tape is pulled from the inside of a loose tape roll making it spin to wind the returning tape onto the roll again. Initially, this mechanism was mounted on a reel to reel tape recorder. Later Cousino developed a plastic housing to be hung up on some tape recorders. First, the magnetic coating was wound to the inside of the reel. This cartridge was marketed by John Herbert Orr as the Orrtronic Tapette. Newer cartridges had magnetic coating wind of the tape outside the reel, which required a special recorder to operate it, but offers comfortable simple inserting the cartridge without threading the tape. This more compact cartridges do not require any bottom spare for the tape head assembly. That would inspire George Eash to make the Fidelipac tape cartridge, which itself would inspire the Stereo-Pak tape cartridge.

Another invention, Cousino patented was a graphite coating bottom side the audio tape, suppressing crumpling when pulling the endless tape from the inner reel. The coating was also used on 8-Track tape, causing the gray appearance of the tape bottom side.

Cousino died in Lee County, Florida on 29 December 1994 at the age of 92.

References

Audio electrical engineers